Sharon Davis (born c.1947 ) was a Canadian ice dancer. She won a gold medal in the now discontinued Fours competition at the 1959 Canadian Figure Skating Championships, with Dean Akins, Clare Snowdy, and Larry Bennett.

References

Canadian female ice dancers
Living people
Year of birth uncertain
Year of birth missing (living people)